Aguinaldo It is a genre of Venezuelan traditional and cultural music, popular in several Latin American countries., based on Spanish Christmas carols or villancicos which is traditionally sung on Christmas itself or during the holiday season. Aguinaldo music is often performed by parrandas - a casual group of people, often family or friends, who merrily go from house to house taking along their singing.the instruments used are four, maracas and drums.one of the aguinaldos popular is burrito sabanero.

Venezuelan aguinaldo 
In Venezuela, aguinaldo is a genre of Christmas music and generally have six verses. Played by "parranderos" or "aguinalderos"  that announce their arrival in song and seek to gain entry to the community houses to relate the story of the birth of Christ, and to share in the joy of the message of Peace on Earth and to all People of Good Will. Aguinaldos are played with typical instruments such as the cuatro (a small, four-string guitar), furruco, and maracas. Other instruments often used are violin, guitar, tambourine, mandolin, bandol, caja (a percussive box instrument), and marímbula (an Afro-Venezuelan instrument). In exchange for the entertainment, "parranderos" are traditionally given food and drink: hallacas, panettone, rum and "Ponche Crema" (a form of alcoholic eggnog).  Aguinaldos are also played at Christmas church celebrations.

Puerto Rican aguinaldo 
 
In Puerto Rico, the aguinaldo is a musical gift offered during the Christmas season and is a tradition inherited from the island's Spanish colonizers.  As a musical gift, aguinaldos are mostly played by "parranderos" or "trullas" during the Christmas holidays. While , showing up at a residence late at night, with a group of Christmas carolers, is a practice that is slowly being lost in Puerto Rico, a Puerto Rican  album debuted in the top 10 Billboard Tropical Albums in December 2019.

Originally, aguinaldos were  "villancicos" with strong religious connotations but soon evolved to "coplas" (quartets) and "decimas" (ten-verses compositions) about all kinds of everyday topics. Aguinaldos were played with typical instruments such as the bordonúa, a tiple, a cuatro, a carracho or güiro, a cowbell, barriles de bomba, an accordion, and maracas. With bordonua players becoming more difficult to find, the guitar became a staple accompanying the cuatro. Today, panderos (also known as "pleneras"), brass instruments and whatever makes noise, are used.

As a genre, the aguinaldo is played mostly on the radio on key Christmas holidays in Puerto Rico; the day before Christmas and in Christmas, on New Year's Eve and New Year's Day, and the day before Three Kings Day and on Three King's Day (January 6). Aguinaldos are also played at Christmas church celebrations.

Philippine aguinaldo 
In the Philippines, the word aguinaldo has come to refer instead to the gift—usually cash or coins—collected by small groups of children that go carolling. A traditional instrument used is a makeshift tambourine made of several tansan (aluminium bottle caps) strung on some wire. Carollers solicit homeowners with the chant "Namamasko po!" (approx. "wassailing!"), and after singing wait to be rewarded with aguinaldo.

Trinidadian aguinaldo 
Aguinaldo or Serenal is a music genre used in Parang (Parranda) a type of Christmas music that came to Trinidad and Tobago from Venezuela. Singers and instrumentalists (collectively known as  "parranderos") travel from house to house in the community, often joined by friends and neighbours family, using whatever instruments are to hand. Popular parang instruments include the cuatro and maracas (locally known as chac-chacs).

See also 
 Music of Puerto Rico
 Venezuelan music
 Trinidadian music

References 

 Atlas de Tradiciones de Venezuela, Fundación Bigott, 1998.

External links 
 La Parranda Puertorriquena: The Music, Symbolism, and Cultural Nationalism of Puerto Rico's Christmas Serenading Tradition
 Espinosa, Juan (1984). Breve Prontuario en Torno a Nuestra Tradición Navideña

Puerto Rican music
Venezuelan music
Christmas music
Christmas traditions